JKCS 041 is a cluster of galaxies with the distinction, as of 2009, of being the farthest galaxy cluster observed from Earth. It is estimated to be 10.2 billion light-years away, seen at redshift 1.9. The cluster is located in the constellation Cetus at a photometrically determined redshift of z=1.9 at right ascension  declination  (J2000.0). There are at least 19 members in the cluster.

See also
 List of the most distant astronomical objects

References

Galaxy clusters
Cetus (constellation)
Articles containing video clips